Yosvany Veitía Soto (also spelled Yosbany, born 12 March 1992) is a Cuban amateur boxer in the light flyweight division who competed at the 2012 Olympics. He is a southpaw.

Career
At the 2010 Youth World Amateur Boxing Championships he won Bronze.

At the 2011 World Amateur Boxing Championships (results) he beat Birzhan Zhakypov and two unknowns but was stopped by Mongolian defending champion Pürevdorjiin Serdamba.
At the 2011 Pan American Games (results) he lost the final to local Joselito Velazquez.

At the 2012 Summer Olympics (results) he beat Australian Billy Ward 26:4, then lost to eventual winner Zou Shiming 10:13.

He also holds two notable wins over Naoya Inoue, the world's best active boxer, pound for pound.

He competed at the 2020 Summer Olympics.

References

External links
 
 
 
 
 

1992 births
Living people
People from Caibarién
Boxers at the 2011 Pan American Games
Boxers at the 2015 Pan American Games
Boxers at the 2019 Pan American Games
Light-flyweight boxers
Boxers at the 2012 Summer Olympics
Boxers at the 2016 Summer Olympics
Olympic boxers of Cuba
Cuban male boxers
AIBA World Boxing Championships medalists
Pan American Games silver medalists for Cuba
Pan American Games medalists in boxing
World boxing champions
Central American and Caribbean Games gold medalists for Cuba
Competitors at the 2014 Central American and Caribbean Games
Central American and Caribbean Games medalists in boxing
Medalists at the 2015 Pan American Games
Medalists at the 2019 Pan American Games
Medalists at the 2011 Pan American Games
Boxers at the 2020 Summer Olympics
21st-century Cuban people